Glucose-6-phosphate isomerase (GPI), alternatively known as phosphoglucose isomerase/phosphoglucoisomerase (PGI) or phosphohexose isomerase (PHI), is an enzyme that in humans is encoded by the GPI gene on chromosome 19. 
This gene encodes a member of the glucose phosphate isomerase protein family. The encoded protein has been identified as a moonlighting protein based on its ability to perform mechanistically distinct functions. In the cytoplasm, the gene product functions as a glycolytic enzyme (glucose-6-phosphate isomerase) that interconverts glucose-6-phosphate (G6P) and fructose-6-phosphate (F6P). Extracellularly, the encoded protein (also referred to as neuroleukin) functions as a neurotrophic factor that promotes survival of skeletal motor neurons and sensory neurons, and as a lymphokine that induces immunoglobulin secretion. The encoded protein is also referred to as autocrine motility factor (AMF) based on an additional function as a tumor-secreted cytokine and angiogenic factor. Defects in this gene are the cause of nonspherocytic hemolytic anemia, and a severe enzyme deficiency can be associated with hydrops fetalis, immediate neonatal death and neurological impairment. Alternative splicing results in multiple transcript variants. [provided by RefSeq, Jan 2014]

Structure 
Functional GPI is a 64-kDa dimer composed of two identical monomers. The two monomers interact notably through the two protrusions in a hugging embrace. The active site of each monomer is formed by a cleft between the two domains and the dimer interface.

GPI monomers are made of two domains, one made of two separate segments called the large domain and the other made of the segment in between called the small domain. The two domains are each  αβα sandwiches, with the small domain containing a five-strand β-sheet surrounded by α-helices while the large domain has a six-stranded β-sheet. The large domain, located at the N-terminal, and the C-terminal of each monomer also contain "arm-like" protrusions. Several residues in the small domain serve to bind phosphate, while other residues, particularly His388, from the large and C-terminal domains are crucial to the sugar ring-opening step catalyzed by this enzyme. Since the isomerization activity occurs at the dimer interface, the dimer structure of this enzyme is critical to its catalytic function.

It is hypothesized that serine phosphorylation of this protein induces a conformational change to its secretory form.

Mechanism 
The mechanism that GPI uses to interconvert glucose 6-phosphate and fructose 6-phosphate (aldose to ketose) consists of three major steps: opening the glucose ring, isomerizing glucose into fructose through an enediol intermediate, and closing the fructose ring.

Isomerization of glucose 

   

Glucose 6-phosphate binds to GPI in its pyranose form. The ring is opened in a "push-pull" mechanism by His388, which protonates the C5 oxygen, and Lys518, which deprotonates the C1 hydroxyl group. This creates an open chain aldose. Then, the substrate is rotated about the C3-C4 bond to position it for isomerization. At this point, Glu357 deprotonates C2 to create a cis-enediolate intermediate stabilized by Arg272. To complete the isomerization, Glu357 donates its proton to C1, the C2 hydroxyl group loses its proton and the open-chain ketose fructose 6-phosphate is formed. Finally, the ring is closed by rotating the substrate about the C3-C4 bond again and deprotonating the C5 hydroxyl with Lys518.

Function 

This gene belongs to the GPI family. The protein encoded by this gene is a dimeric enzyme that catalyzes the reversible isomerization of G6P and F6P. Since the reaction is reversible, its direction is determined by G6P and F6P concentrations.

glucose 6-phosphate ↔ fructose 6-phosphate

The protein has different functions inside and outside the cell. In the cytoplasm, the protein is involved in glycolysis and gluconeogenesis, as well as the pentose phosphate pathway. Outside the cell, it functions as a neurotrophic factor for spinal and sensory neurons, called neuroleukin. The same protein is also secreted by cancer cells, where it is called autocrine motility factor and stimulates metastasis. Extracellular GPI is also known to function as a maturation factor.

Neuroleukin

Though originally treated as separate proteins, cloning technology demonstrated that GPI is almost identical to the protein neuroleukin.  Neuroleukin is a neurotrophic factor for spinal and sensory neurons. It is found in large amounts in muscle, brain, heart, and kidneys. Neuroleukin also acts as a lymphokine secreted by T cells stimulated by lectin. It induces immunoglobulin secretion in B cells as part of a response that activates antibody-secreting cells.

Autocrine motility factor
Cloning experiments also revealed that GPI is identical to the protein known as autocrine motility factor (AMF). AMF produced and secreted by cancer cells and stimulates cell growth and motility as a growth factor. AMF is thought to play a key role in cancer metastasis by activating the MAPK/ERK or PI3K/AKT pathways. In the PI3K/AKT pathway, AMF interacts with gp78/AMFR to regulate ER calcium release, and therefore protect against apoptosis in response to ER stress.

Prokaryotic bifunctional glucose-6-phosphate isomerase

In some archaea and bacteria glucose-6-phosphate isomerase activity occurs via a bifunctional enzyme that also exhibits phosphomannose isomerase (PMI) activity. Though not closely related to eukaryotic GPIs, the bifunctional enzyme is similar enough that the sequence includes the cluster of threonines and serines that forms the sugar phosphate-binding site in conventional GPI. The enzyme is thought to use the same catalytic mechanisms for both glucose ring-opening and isomerization for the interconversion of G6P to F6P.

Clinical significance 

A deficiency of GPI is responsible for 4% of the hemolytic anemias due to glycolytic enzyme deficiencies. Several cases of GPI deficiency have recently been identified.

Elevated serum GPI levels have been used as a prognostic biomarker for colorectal, breast, lung, kidney, gastrointestinal, and other cancers. As AMF, GPI is attributed with regulating cell migration during invasion and metastasis. One study showed that the external layers of breast tumor spheroids (BTS) secrete GPI, which induces epithelial–mesenchymal transition (EMT), invasion, and metastasis in BTS. The GPI inhibitors ERI4P and 6PG were found to block metastasis of BTS but not BTS glycolysis or fibroblast viability. In addition, GPI is secreted exclusively by tumor cells and not normal cells. For these reasons, GPI inhibitors may be a safer, more targeted approach for anti-cancer therapy. GPI also participates in a positive feedback loop with HER2, a major breast cancer therapeutic target, as GPI enhances HER2 expression and HER2 overexpression enhances GPI expression, and so on. As a result, GPI activity likely confers resistance in breast cancer cells against HER2-based therapies using Herceptin/Trastuzumab, and should be considered as an additional target when treating patients.

Applications 

Human GPI is capable of inducing arthritis in mice with varied genetic backgrounds via intradermal injection.

See also 
Fructose-1-phosphate-aldolase enzyme, which converts fructose to glucose

Interactions 

GPI is known to interact with:
AMFR, and
HER2.

Interactive pathway map

References

Further reading

External links 
 Glucose-6-phosphate isomerase in PROSITE
 Phosphoglucose Isomerase
 Glucose phosphate isomerase deficiency

Protein domains
EC 5.3.1
Tumor markers
Glycolysis enzymes
Glycolysis